North Liberty Historic District is a national historic district located at North Liberty, St. Joseph County, Indiana.  The district encompasses 14 contributing buildings in the central business district of North Liberty.  It was developed between about 1880 and 1960, and includes examples of Italianate, Classical Revival, and Art Moderne architecture.  Notable buildings include the Worter Building (1892), Finch Block (c. 1900), Hoffman Block (c. 1885), L.W. Pommert Building (1920), North Liberty City Hall (1915), Masonic Hall (c. 1925), Community State Bank (1960), Starr Grocery (c. 1911), North Liberty State Bank (c. 1911), Service Garage (c. 1935), and Modern Speed Wash (1960).

It was listed on the National Register of Historic Places in 2014.

References

Historic districts on the National Register of Historic Places in Indiana
Italianate architecture in Indiana
Neoclassical architecture in Indiana
Modernist architecture in Indiana
Historic districts in St. Joseph County, Indiana
National Register of Historic Places in St. Joseph County, Indiana